Sid Bernstein may refer to:

 Sid Bernstein (editor) (1907–1993), executive committee chairman of Crain Publications and editor of Advertising Age
 Sid Bernstein (impresario) (1918–2013), American music promoter, talent manager, and author

See also
 Sid Bernstein Presents, a 2010 documentary film
 Sidney Bernstein (disambiguation)